Ibuki Nagae (born 3 March 2002) is a Japanese professional footballer who plays as a defender for WE League club INAC Kobe Leonessa.

Club career 
Nagae made her WE League debut on 12 September 2021.

References 

Japanese women's footballers
Women's association football defenders
Association football people from Toyama Prefecture
INAC Kobe Leonessa players
WE League players
Living people
2002 births